Desulfatirhabdium butyrativorans is a Gram-negative, sulfate-reducing and butyrate-oxidizing bacterium from the genus of Desulfatirhabdium which has been isolated from anaerobic sludge in the Netherlands.

References

External links 
Type strain of Desulfatirhabdium butyrativorans at BacDive -  the Bacterial Diversity Metadatabase

Desulfobacterales
Bacteria described in 2008